Tammara Thibeault (born December 27, 1996) is a Canadian boxer competing in the Middleweight category.

Personal life
Thibeault started boxing at the age of 10 and has a bachelor degrees in linguistics and two minors in Mandarin and Spanish. Thibeault plans to open an International Corporation after her retirement from the sport of boxing.

Career

Senior
At her first Senior event, Thibeault won the gold medal at the 2017 Pan American Championships which were held in Tegucigalpa, Honduras.

At the 2018 Commonwealth Games in Gold Coast, Australia, Thibeault won the bronze medal in the middleweight event.

At the 2019 Pan American Games, Thibeault originally won the bronze medal in the middleweight event, but was later upgraded to silver after the gold medalist was stripped of her medal due to doping.

Thibeault won a bronze medal at the 2019 AIBA Women's World Boxing Championships.

Thibeault qualified to represent Canada at the 2020 Summer Olympics. Ultimately, Thibeault would lose in the quarterfinals of the middleweight event, one win away from a guaranteed medal.

In April 2022, Thibeault won the gold medal at the 2022 Pan American Championships which were held in Guayquil, Ecuador, which represented her second gold medal win at the tournament. Thiebeault defeated Panama's Atheyna Bylon in an unanimous decision to win gold. The following month, at the 2022 IBA Women's World Boxing Championships, Thibeault would go on to win the gold medal in the middleweight event, by beating Panama's Atheyna Bylon again in a 4−1 decision.

References

1996 births
Living people
AIBA Women's World Boxing Championships medalists
Canadian women boxers
People from Saint-Georges, Quebec
Sportspeople from Quebec
Middleweight boxers
Boxers at the 2018 Commonwealth Games
Commonwealth Games bronze medallists for Canada
Commonwealth Games medallists in boxing
Boxers at the 2019 Pan American Games
Boxers at the 2020 Summer Olympics
Pan American Games silver medalists for Canada
Pan American Games medalists in boxing
Medalists at the 2019 Pan American Games
Olympic boxers of Canada
20th-century Canadian women
21st-century Canadian women
Boxers at the 2022 Commonwealth Games
Medallists at the 2018 Commonwealth Games
Medallists at the 2022 Commonwealth Games